Grail, in comics, may refer to:

 The Grail, a secret organization in Preacher
 Grail (WildStorm), a WildStorm character and member of Wetworks
 Grail (DC Comics), a fictional character in the DC Universe

See also
Grail (disambiguation)